Doug Fry was a professional rugby league footballer in the Australian competition the New South Wales Rugby League.

Fry played for the Eastern Suburbs club in the seasons 1942–44.

References
The Encyclopedia of Rugby League; Alan Whiticker and Glen Hudson

Australian rugby league players
Sydney Roosters players
Year of birth missing
Year of death missing
Place of birth missing
Place of death missing